Love Must Be Tough is Eleanor McEvoy's seventh studio album, released in February 2008. Unlike her previous six albums, which, with the exception of a few tracks, were written solely by McEvoy, Love Must Be Tough is a mixture of covers/interpretations and self-penned selections.

The album's theme of turning 40 amid mid-life crises is exemplified by the opening track, a fresh interpretation of The Rolling Stones song "Mother's Little Helper". The following eleven tracks continue this theme right up to the closing track, which takes a new look at Nick Lowe's rock classic "I Knew the Bride (When She Used to Rock 'n Roll)".

In October 2008 Love Must Be Tough was named Record of the Year by Hi-Fi+ Magazine.

Track listings

Singles
Easy In Love
Old New Borrowed and Blue
Shame On The Moon

Other formats
Love Must Be Tough was released in Hybrid Stereo SACD format in May 2008, and on vinyl (LDIV012) in  September 2008.

References

2008 albums
Eleanor McEvoy albums